Mansour bin Zayed bin Sultan Al Nahyan KBE (born 21 November 1970), often referred to as Sheikh Mansour, is an Emirati politician who is the deputy prime minister of the United Arab Emirates, minister of presidential affairs, billionaire and member of the ruling family of Abu Dhabi. He is the brother of the current President of the UAE, Mohamed bin Zayed Al Nahyan, and is married to one of the daughters of Mohammed bin Rashid Al Maktoum, the ruler of Dubai. Through City Football Group he holds stakes in a variety of football clubs, including Manchester City FC.

He is involved in various government-run companies in the UAE. He is chairman of the Ministerial Development Council, the Emirates Investment Authority and the Emirates Racing Authority. He sits on the Supreme Petroleum Council and the Supreme Council for Financial and Economic Affairs. Mansour is a member of the boards of Abu Dhabi National Oil Company and Abu Dhabi Investment Authority (ADIA). He is vice chairman of Mubadala Investment Company, the Emirati state-owned sovereign wealth fund. He is chairman of the UAE central bank. 

He is also the owner of the Abu Dhabi United Group (ADUG), an investment company for the Abu Dhabi royal family, that acquired Manchester City Football Club in September 2008. He immediately handed all responsibility and ownership to Khaldoon Al Mubarak and the City Football Group which has overseen a significant transformation at the club since then. The club have won six top flight league titles for the first time since 1968; City's first Premier League titles. On 21 May 2013, Major League Soccer of the United States announced that its second New York City club, to be called New York City FC, would begin play in the 2015 season and be majority-owned by Mansour in association with brothers Hal and Hank Steinbrenner.

Early life and education
Mansour was born in the Abu Dhabi emirate on 21 November 1970, the fifth son of the Emir of Abu Dhabi Sheikh Zayed bin Sultan Al Nahyan. His mother is Sheikha Fatima bint Mubarak Al Ketbi and he has five full-brothers: President Mohammed, Hamdan, Hazza, Tahnoun, and Abdullah. They are known as Bani Fatima or sons of Fatima.

Mansour attended Santa Barbara Community College as an English student in 1989. He is a graduate of United Arab Emirates University where he received a bachelor's degree in international affairs in 1993.

Political career
In 1997, Mansour was appointed chairman of the presidential office, at which time his father Sheikh Zayed was the president of the UAE. After the death of his father, he was appointed by his eldest half brother, Khalifa II, as the first minister of presidential affairs of the United Arab Emirates, following a merger of the presidential office and presidential court. He also served in a number of positions in Abu Dhabi to support his brother, Crown Prince Mohammed bin Zayed Al Nahyan.

He was appointed chairman of the ministerial council for services (now Ministerial Development Council). Since 2000 he chaired National Center for Documentation and Research. In 2004 reshuffle, he became minister for presidential affairs. In 2005, he became the deputy chairman of the Abu Dhabi education council (ADEC), chairman of the Emirates Foundation, Abu Dhabi Food Control Authority, and Abu Dhabi Fund for Development. In 2006, he was named the chairman of the Abu Dhabi Judicial Department. In 2007, he was appointed chairman of Khalifa bin Zayed Charity Foundation.

Mansour served as the chairman of First Gulf Bank until 2006, and as a member of the board of trustees of the Zayed charitable and humanitarian foundation. Mansour has established scholarship programs for U.A.E students to study abroad. He is also chairman of the Emirates horse racing authority (EHRA). On 11 May 2009, he was appointed deputy prime minister, retaining his cabinet post of minister of presidential affairs.

Business portfolio 
Mansour is the vice chairman of the Emirati state-owned Mubadala Investment Company. He was formerly chairman of IPIC. After the 1Malaysia Development Berhad (1MDB) scandal was highlighted and Khadem al-Qubaisi, who was managing IPIC, was arrested in 2016, IPIC was folded into Aabar Investments. Qubaisi blamed Mansour and the UAE authorities for using him as a scapegoat in the affair.

In 2005, he was appointed as a member of the Supreme Petroleum Council. In the same year he chaired the board of directors of IPIC and became the board member of the Abu Dhabi Investment Authority (ADIA). In 2007, he was appointed chairman of the Emirates Investment Authority, the sovereign wealth fund of UAE.

Mansour has a 32% stake in Virgin Galactic after investing $280 million in the project through Aabar in July 2009. Aabar also has a 9.1% stake in Daimler after purchasing the stake for $2.7 billion in March 2009 and it was reported that Aabar wishes to increase its stake to 15% in August 2010. He owns the Abu Dhabi Media Investment Corporation (ADMIC) which partnered with British Sky Broadcasting to establish Sky News Arabia – a new Arabic-language news channel headquartered in Abu Dhabi. ADMIC also owns the English-language newspaper The National.

Sport
Mansour is an accomplished horse rider and has won a number of endurance racing tournaments held in the Middle East, and is chairman of the Emirates horse racing authority. He is a strong supporter of Arabian horse racing and the patron of the annual Zayed International Half Marathon competition in Abu Dhabi.

He is the chairman of the Al Jazira sports company and was a leading figure in Abu Dhabi's successful bid to host the FIFA Club World Cup in 2009 and 2010. The company owns Al Jazira Club, which plays football, volleyball, handball and basketball. The football club won the President's Cup in 2010–2011, 2011–2012 and 2015–2016.

In September 2008, Sheikh Mansour acquired Manchester City football club from former Thai prime minister Thaksin Shinawatra. By 23 September 2008, the Abu Dhabi United Group, backed by Mansour, completed their takeover negotiations and the ownership was transferred to them. He also owns the City Football Group, which was founded in 2014 and consists of Manchester City FC, Melbourne City FC, New York City FC, Mumbai City FC and others.

Personal life
Mansour married Sheikha Alia bint Mohammed bin Butti Al Hamed in the mid-1990s. They have one son, Zayed, who has been married to Sheikha Meera bint Hazza bin Zayed Al Nahyan since May 2022.

In 2005, Mansour married Sheikha Manal bint Mohammed bin Rashid Al Maktoum. She is the daughter of Mohammed bin Rashid Al Maktoum ruler of Dubai. They have two daughters and three sons: Fatima (2006), Mohammed (2007), Hamdan (2011), Latifa (2014) and Rashid (2017).

Honours
 Honorary Knight Commander of The Most Excellent Order of the British Empire (2013)

Ancestry

References

1970 births
Living people
United Arab Emirates University alumni
House of Al Nahyan
Emirati bankers
Emirati politicians
Emirati Muslims
Deputy Prime Ministers of the United Arab Emirates
Government ministers of the United Arab Emirates
Children of presidents of the United Arab Emirates
Emirati football chairmen and investors
Manchester City F.C. directors and chairmen
Honorary Knights Commander of the Order of the British Empire
Sons of monarchs